Netaji may refer to :

People
Subhas Chandra Bose, 20th-century Indian nationalist leader and politician
Netaji Palkar, Sarsenapati (Commander in Chief) of the Maratha Empire

Place
Netaji Subhas Chandra Bose International Airport, International Airport in West Bengal, India
Netaji Subhas Chandra Bose Gomoh railway station, Railway station in Jharkhand, India
Netaji Subhash Chandra Bose Island, island in South Andaman Islands, India
Netaji Bhawan, Historic building
Netaji Bhavan metro station, Metro station in Kolkata, India
Netaji Subhash Place metro station, Metro station in Delhi, India
Netaji metro station, metro station in Kolkata, India
Netaji Subhas Road, Kolkata Road in Kolkata, India
Netaji Nagar, Delhi, Neighbourhood in South West Delhi, Delhi, India
Netaji Nagar, Kolkata, Neighbourhood in Kolkata in West Bengal, India

Institutes
Netaji Subhas National Institute of Sports, academic wing of the Sports Authority of India, located in Patiala, India
Netaji Subhash Chandra Bose Medical College, medical college in India
Netaji Subhash Engineering College 
Netaji Subhas University of Technology 
Netaji Subhas Institute of Technology, Bihta 
Netaji Subhas Open University Open University in Kolkata, India
Netaji Subhash Vidyaniketan 
Netaji Subhas Mahavidyalaya 
Netaji Subhash Mahavidyalaya, Udaipur

Culture
Netaji Palkar (film), 1927 film by V. Shantaram
Netaji Subhas Chandra Bose: The Forgotten Hero, 2004 film by Shyam Benegal
Netaji (TV series), a 2019 Bengali television soap opera about the life of Subhash Chandra Bose
Netaji (film), Upcoming Irula-language film
Netaji (magazine), Tamil magazine